José Gutiérrez (born May 28, 1996) is a Mexican racing driver. He is the younger brother of former Formula One driver Esteban Gutiérrez.

Racing record

Career summary

Motorsports career results

American open–wheel racing
(key) (Races in bold indicate pole position; races in italics indicate fastest lap)

Pro Mazda Championship

WeatherTech SportsCar Championship results
(key)(Races in bold indicate pole position. Races in italics indicate fastest race lap in class. Results are overall/class)

24 Hours of Le Mans results

References

External links
 

1996 births
Living people
Mexican racing drivers
Racing drivers from Nuevo León
Indy Pro 2000 Championship drivers
WeatherTech SportsCar Championship drivers
24 Hours of Daytona drivers
24 Hours of Le Mans drivers

Juncos Hollinger Racing drivers
Starworks Motorsport drivers
AFS Racing drivers
G-Drive Racing drivers
TDS Racing drivers
Graff Racing drivers
European Le Mans Series drivers
DragonSpeed drivers